Bielefeld – Gütersloh II is an electoral constituency (German: Wahlkreis) represented in the Bundestag. It elects one member via first-past-the-post voting. Under the current constituency numbering system, it is designated as constituency 132. It is located in eastern North Rhine-Westphalia, comprising the city of Bielefeld and a small part of the district of Gütersloh.

Bielefeld – Gütersloh II was created for the inaugural 1949 federal election. Since 2017, it has been represented by Wiebke Esdar of the Social Democratic Party (SPD).

Geography
Bielefeld – Gütersloh II is located in eastern North Rhine-Westphalia. As of the 2021 federal election, it comprises the independent city of Bielefeld and the municipality of Werther from the Gütersloh district.

History
Gütersloh I was created in 1949, then known as Bielefeld-Stadt. In the 1976 election, it was named Bielefeld II. From 1980 through 2009, it was named Bielefeld. It acquired its current name in the 2013 election. In the 1949 election, it was North Rhine-Westphalia constituency 47 in the numbering system. From 1949 through 1961, it was number 106. From 1965 through 1976, it was number 104. From 1980 through 1998, it was number 102. From 2002 through 2009, it was number 133. Since 2013, it has been number 132.

Originally, the constituency was coterminous with the independent city of Bielefeld. In the 1976 election, it was coterminous with Bielefeld excluding the former municipalities of Brackwede, Sennestadt, Senne, Gadderbaum, and Schröttinghausen. In the 1980 through 1994 elections, it was again coterminous with Bielefeld. In the 1998 election, it acquired the municipality of Werther.

Members
The constituency has been held by the Social Democratic Party (SPD) during all but two Bundestag terms since 1949. It was first represented by Friederike Nadig of the SPD from 1949 to 1953, followed by Artur Ladebeck and Otto Walpert for a single term each. Gerhard Koch served three terms from 1961 to 1972, followed by Elfriede Eilers until 1980. Kurt Vogelsang then served a single term before Reinhard Meyer zu Bentrup of the Christian Democratic Union (CDU) was elected. Günter Rixe regained the constituency for the SPD in 1987 and served until 1998. Rainer Wend served from then to 2009, when Christina Kampmann of the CDU won the constituency. Lena Strothmann regained it for the SPD in 2013. Wiebke Esdar was elected in 2017 and re-elected in 2021.

Election results

2021 election

2017 election

2013 election

2009 election

References

Federal electoral districts in North Rhine-Westphalia
1949 establishments in West Germany
Constituencies established in 1949
Bielefeld
Gütersloh (district)